A clitoral hood piercing is a genital piercing through the clitoral hood surrounding the clitoris.  There are two main types of hood piercing: the vertical clitoral hood piercing and the horizontal clitoral hood piercing. As the name indicates, the difference is in the direction the piercing is oriented in the skin above the clitoris.  Neither of these piercings penetrates the clitoris itself.

Pain, healing and aftercare
Compared to other piercings, clitoral hood piercings tend to be rather uncomplicated with regard to the piercing process itself as well as the healing, which certainly contributes to the popularity of the piercing. In contrast to common expectations, this piercing is no more painful to perform than other body piercings. Since the piercing passes through a thin layer of tissue, it is quick to pierce and reportedly hurts less than ear piercings. Clitoral hood piercings also have rather short healing times, due to the amount of blood circulation to the area. During the healing period however, the piercing is a wound and can increase the risk of sexually transmitted diseases.

Jewelry

A wide variety of body piercing jewelry can be worn in clitoral hood piercings.  Barbells, J-bars and  other bar-style jewelry are common in vertical hood piercings, and both captive bead rings and barbells are common in horizontal hood piercings.  It is not uncommon for the beads of a barbell to be decorative, as is common in navel piercings.

References

Female genital piercings
Clitoris